Martina Chukwuma-Ezike (born 1981) is the founder and CEO of the Asthma and Allergy Foundation, Scotland’s only dedicated asthma charity, and the first Black woman to be elected Rector of the University of Aberdeen, Scotland.

Biography 
Martina Chukwuma-Ezike was born in Nigeria in 1981 and grew up in Cross River State. She first completed a diploma at the University of Calabar in Social Works, from 1999 to 2001, going on to study for a degree in Sociology in 2002, graduating in 2005 with a B.Sc. 

After briefly working for the Nigerian National Petroleum Corporation, in 2008 she moved to the United Kingdom, where the following year she attained an MBA from the University of Aberdeen.

Suffering from a severe form of asthma, known as brittle asthma, which made studying difficult for her, Chukwuma-Ezike noticed the lack of suitable support available in the Northeast of Britain, which led to her decision to found a charity separate from Asthma UK in 2009 – Asthma and Allergy Foundation, Scotland's only asthma charity, of which she is chief executive.

In 2021, Chukwuma-Ezike was elected rector of the University of Aberdeen, taking over from Maggie Chapman, and becoming the first person of colour to hold the post.

Selected publications
 What do you know about asthma? (2013, Xlibris:)

References

External links
Chukwuma-Ezike's LinkedIn page

Aberdeen
1981 births
Alumni of the University of Aberdeen
University of Calabar alumni
Living people
Nigerian expatriate academics
Nigerian emigrants to the United Kingdom
People from Cross River State
People from Aberdeen
Women founders
Organization founders
Rectors of the University of Aberdeen